Pachypatella is a genus of fungi in the family Parmulariaceae.

References

Parmulariaceae
Taxa described in 1915
Taxa named by Ferdinand Theissen
Taxa named by Hans Sydow
Dothideomycetes genera